In chemistry, a dialdose is a monosaccharide containing two aldehyde groups.  For example, the hexodialdose O=CH–(CHOH)4–CH=O, obtained by reducing glucuronic acid with sodium amalgam.

References

Monosaccharides